1882 in sport describes the year's events in world sport.

Athletics
USA Outdoor Track and Field Championships

American football
College championship
 College football national championship – Yale Bulldogs
Events
 At the 1882 rules meeting, Walter Camp proposes that a team be required to advance the ball a minimum of five yards within three downs. These down-and-distance rules, combined with the already-established line of scrimmage, transform the game from a variation of rugby or association football into the distinct sport of American football.

Association football
England
 FA Cup final – Old Etonians 1–0 Blackburn Rovers at The Oval, the first time that a professional club has reached the final
 Tottenham Hotspur founded as Hotspur FC by members of the Hotspur Cricket Club in Tottenham.
Ireland
 18 February — Ireland makes its international debut, losing 13–0 to England in Belfast.  Ireland is the world's fourth international team following England, Scotland and Wales.
Scotland
 Scottish Cup final – Queen's Park 4–1 Dumbarton (replay following a 2–2 draw)

Bandy
Events
 Charles G. Tebbutt of the Bury Fen bandy club is responsible for the first published rules of bandy and also for introducing the game into the Netherlands and Sweden, as well as elsewhere in England.

Baseball
National championship
 National League v. American Association – Chicago White Stockings (NL) 1–1 Cincinnati Reds (AA)
Events
 Foundation of Cincinnati Reds, Pittsburgh Pirates and St. Louis Cardinals
 The American Association opens in six southerly cities from St. Louis to Philadelphia, a new professional baseball league that will rival the NL.
 The National League completes two years with one circuit, eight northerly cities from Chicago to Boston.

Biking
 February 22 - New York City's 24 hour bike race wins James Saunders, who ran 120 miles and won 100 dollars

Boxing
Events
 7 February — John L. Sullivan defeats Paddy Ryan in nine rounds at Mississippi City to claim the Heavyweight Championship of America.  Apart from Sullivan's famous 1889 fight against Jake Kilrain, this is the last major bareknuckle contest fought under London Prize Ring Rules.  Sullivan will increasingly fight under Queensberry Rules from now on using gloves and will become the first generally recognised World Heavyweight Champion from 1885.

Cricket
Events
 England, led by Alfred Shaw, tours Australia and plays a four-match Test series. Australia wins the series 2–0.
 8 April (approx.)  — formation of Warwickshire County Cricket Club at a meeting in Coventry
 10 May — formation of Durham County Cricket Club
 8, 9 & 10 June — Somerset County Cricket Club plays its inaugural first-class match v. Lancashire at Old Trafford and joins the County Championship, but for only four seasons initially.
 28 & 29 August — England v. Australia at The Oval (only Test of the season).  Australia wins the most famous match in history by 7 runs with F. R. Spofforth, the original "Demon Bowler", taking 7–46 and 7–44.  Soon afterwards, The Sporting Times prints its legendary obituary notice:

In Affectionate Remembrance
of
ENGLISH CRICKET,
which died at the Oval
on
29th AUGUST, 1882,
Deeply lamented by a large circle of sorrowing
friends and acquaintances
----
R.I.P.
----
N.B.—The body will be cremated and the
ashes taken to Australia.

England
 Champion County –  Lancashire and Nottinghamshire share the title
 Most runs – Billy Murdoch 1,582 @ 31.64 (HS 286*)
 Most wickets – Ted Peate 214 @ 11.52 (BB 8–32)
Australia
 Most runs – Billy Murdoch 679 @ 61.72 (HS 321)
 Most wickets – Joey Palmer 47 @ 21.55 (BB 7–46)

Golf
Major tournaments
 British Open – Bob Ferguson

Horse racing
England
 Grand National – Seaman
 1,000 Guineas Stakes – St. Marguerite
 2,000 Guineas Stakes – Shotover
 The Derby – Shotover
 The Oaks – Geheimniss
 St. Leger Stakes – Dutch Oven
Australia
 Melbourne Cup – The Assyrian
Canada
 Queen's Plate – Fanny Wiser
Ireland
 Irish Grand National – Chantilly
 Irish Derby Stakes – Sortie
USA
 Kentucky Derby – Apollo
 Preakness Stakes – Vanguard
 Belmont Stakes – Forester

Lacrosse
Events
 The first high school lacrosse teams are formed: Phillips Academy, Phillips Exeter Academy and the Lawrenceville School.
 Seven colleges form the first Intercollegiate Lacrosse Association (ILA), which was later replaced by the Intercollegiate Lacrosse League in 1905 (which was renamed the U.S. Intercollegiate Lacrosse Association in 1929).

Rowing
The Boat Race
 1 April — Oxford wins the 39th Oxford and Cambridge Boat Race

England
 Leicester Rowing Club was formed

Rugby football
Events
 Foundation of Waterloo R.F.C.

Tennis
England
 Wimbledon Men's Singles Championship – William Renshaw (GB) defeats Ernest Renshaw (GB) 6–1 2–6 4–6 6–2 6–2
USA
 American Men's Singles Championship – Richard D. Sears (USA) defeats Clarence M. Clark (USA) 6–1 6–4 6–0
World
The 6th pre-open era 1882 Men's Tennis season gets underway 43 tournaments are staged this year from 24 April to 12 November.

References

 
Sports by year